The Great Guild was a guild for merchants and artisans, operating in Tallinn from at least the 14th century until 1920. It was based in the Great Guild hall, a Gothic building in the historical centre of Tallinn, today housing the Estonian History Museum. In 2013, the Great Guild hall was named a European Heritage site.

The building was erected in 1407-1410, with the interiors finished in 1417. The façade is decorated with blind arches, and has a typical, prominent portal. Inside, the main hall especially retains the medieval atmosphere. It is a large room, supported by a range of pillars with decoratively carved capitals.

The Great Guildhall is considered a typical example of medieval Tallinn architecture.

References

Buildings and structures in Tallinn
History of Tallinn
Kesklinn, Tallinn
Gothic architecture in Estonia